Harry Hassett (1905–1971) was an Australian tennis player. He was the brother of cricket legend Lindsay Hassett and was a fine cricket all-rounder himself, but tennis took priority over cricket for Harry. Sporting Globe described Hassett's tennis game by saying he was "sound in all departments of the game except his second serve, which is decidedly weak, and strong physically". Hassett had a great backhand. Hassett made his debut at the Australian championships in 1930 and lost in five sets to Harry Hopman in round three. In 1931 he lost in the quarter finals to Jack Cummings. In 1933 he took the first set from top seed Ellsworth Vines but lost in four sets in round two.

References

1905 births
1971 deaths
Australian male tennis players
Tennis people from Victoria (Australia)
20th-century Australian people